One Foot in Front is the seventh studio album by Australian pop singer John Paul Young, released in March 1984. The album spawned four singles, "Soldier of Fortune" in 1983, and "War Games", "L.A. Sunset" and "Call the Night" in 1984. For European release in 1984, the album was titled Soldier of Fortune, and for re-release in 1992 it was renamed War Games. It is the first Young album to not feature Vanda & Young as producers.

In 1992 the album was remastered and released on CD and it came with seven bonus tracks.

Overview 
In 1983, Young signed to the Australian branch of German label I.C. Records. He flew to Germany with producer, composer and keyboard player John Capek to record a new album. Additional sessions in Los Angeles, Melbourne and Sydney.

Track listing 

Side one

Side two

Bonus tracks

Personnel 
John Paul Young and the All Star Band
Arranged By [Horns] – Bill Shepherd
John Paul Young - Vocals
John Capek - Keyboards, Synthesizer
Steve McDonnell - Didgeridoo 
Alex Conti - Guitar 
Mark Punch - Guitar
Russell Dunlop - Percussion, Backing Vocals)
Veronica Lee - Backing Vocals
Wendy Matthews - Backing Vocals
Marc Jordan - Backing Vocals
Warren Morgan - Keyboards [Additional]
The Munich Horns - Horns

Producer – John Capek (tracks: 1 to 10, 12 to 17), John Paul Young (tracks: 11), Warren Morgan (tracks: 11)
Notes: Originally recorded in 1983 between Europe and Australia and issued as "One Foot In Front".
Tracks 11 and 16 are taken from 12" single "Soldier Of Fortune" released in 1983.
Tracks 12 and 17 are taken from 12" maxi-single "War Games" released in 1984.

References 

John Paul Young albums
1984 albums
Festival Records albums
1992 albums